Wilkinsonellus is a genus of braconid wasps in the family Braconidae. There are more than 20 described species in Wilkinsonellus, generally found in warmer parts of the globe.

Species
These species belong to the genus Wilkinsonellus:
 Wilkinsonellus alexsmithi Arias-Penna & Whitfield, 2013 (Costa Rica)
 Wilkinsonellus amplus Austin & Dangerfield, 1992 (Australia)
 Wilkinsonellus arabicus van Achterberg & Fernandez-Triana, 2017 (Yemen)
 Wilkinsonellus corpustriacolor Arias-Penna, Zhang & Whitfield, 2014 (Fiji)
 Wilkinsonellus daira (Nixon, 1965) (Papua New Guinea)
 Wilkinsonellus fijiensis Arias-Penna, Zhang & Whitfield, 2014 (Fiji)
 Wilkinsonellus flavicrus Long & van Achterberg, 2011 (Vietnam)
 Wilkinsonellus granulatus Ahmad, Pandey, Haider & Shujauddin, 2005 (India)
 Wilkinsonellus henicopus (de Saeger, 1944) (Congo, Kenya)
 Wilkinsonellus iphitus (Nixon, 1965) (China, Philippines)
 Wilkinsonellus kogui Arias-Penna & Whitfield, 2013 (Colombia)
 Wilkinsonellus longicentrus Long & van Achterberg, 2003 (Vietnam)
 Wilkinsonellus masoni Long & van Achterberg, 2011 (Vietnam)
 Wilkinsonellus narangahus Rousse & Gupta, 2013 (Réunion)
 Wilkinsonellus nescalptura Arias-Penna, Zhang & Whitfield, 2014 (Fiji)
 Wilkinsonellus nigratus Long & van Achterberg, 2011 (Vietnam)
 Wilkinsonellus nigrocentrus Long & van Achterberg, 2011 (Vietnam)
 Wilkinsonellus panamaensis Arias-Penna & Whitfield, 2013 (Panama)
 Wilkinsonellus paramplus Long & van Achterberg, 2003 (China, Vietnam)
 Wilkinsonellus striatus Austin & Dangerfield, 1992 (Australia, Papua New Guinea)
 Wilkinsonellus thyone (Nixon, 1965) (Philippines)
 Wilkinsonellus tobiasi Long, 2007 (Vietnam)
 Wilkinsonellus tomi Austin & Dangerfield, 1992 (Australia, Papua New Guinea)

References

Microgastrinae
Braconidae genera